Roberto Cervantes (born 27 February 1948) is a Mexican boxer. He competed in the men's bantamweight event at the 1968 Summer Olympics.

References

External links
 
 

1948 births
Living people
Mexican male boxers
Olympic boxers of Mexico
Boxers at the 1968 Summer Olympics
Boxers from Mexico City
Bantamweight boxers